Kaaterskill may refer to:

Kaaterskill Clove, a deep gorge, or valley, in New York's eastern Catskill Mountains
Kaaterskill Creek, a tributary of Catskill Creek
Kaaterskill Falls (disambiguation)
Kaaterskill High Peak, one of the Catskill Mountains
Kaaterskill Junction Railroad Station
Kaaterskill Railroad
Kaaterskill Railroad Station
Kaaterskill (ship, 1882), paddle steamer